The Afghanistan Repatriation Memorial is a war memorial in Trenton, Ontario, Canada to memorialize Canadian Forces casualties in Afghanistan. The memorial was funded by a public fundraiser announced in July, 2011, and opened November 11, 2012.

See also
Canadian war memorials

References

War in Afghanistan (2001–2021)
Canadian military memorials and cemeteries
Monuments and memorials in Ontario
2012 establishments in Ontario